Nikolay Davydenko was the defending champion but lost in the second round, 7–6(7–5), 5–7, 6–3, against fellow Russian and qualifier Igor Andreev. In the end, it was another Russian, Mikhail Youzhny, who won in the final, 6–7(7–9), 6–2, 7–6(7–3), against Andrey Golubev from Kazakhstan.

Seeds
The top four seeds receive a bye into the second round.

Draw

Finals

Top half

Bottom half

References
Main Draw
Qualifying Singles

Proton Malaysian Open - Singles
- Singles, 2010 Proton Malaysian Open